Sulfotransferase family cytosolic 1B member 1 is an enzyme that in humans is encoded by the SULT1B1 gene.

Sulfotransferase enzymes catalyze the sulfate conjugation of many hormones, neurotransmitters, drugs, and xenobiotic compounds. These cytosolic enzymes are different in their tissue distributions and substrate specificities. The gene structure (number and length of exons) is similar among family members. However, the total genomic length of this gene is greater than that of all of the other SULT1 genes.

References

Further reading